Compactness can refer to:
 Compact space, in topology
 Compact operator, in functional analysis
 Compactness theorem, in first-order logic
 Compactness measure of a shape, a numerical quantity representing the degree to which a shape is compact